Amor de Mãe (English: A Mother's Love) is a Brazilian telenovela produced and broadcast by TV Globo. It premiered on 25 November 2019, replacing A Dona do Pedaço, and ended on 9 April 2021. The series is written by Manuela Dias, with the collaboration of Mariana Mesquita, Roberto Vitorino and Walter Daguerre.

It stars Regina Casé, Adriana Esteves and Taís Araújo as three women from different social classes who live their dilemmas as mothers. Isis Valverde, Humberto Carrão, Chay Suede, Irandhir Santos, Juliano Cazarré, Arieta Corrêa, Vladimir Brichta and Murilo Benício also star in the main roles.

In March 2020, the telenovela went on an indefinite hiatus after production was shut down due to the COVID-19 pandemic in Brazil. Filming resumed on 10 August 2020, with new episodes returning on 15 March 2021. A total of 125 episodes of Amor de Mãe were aired during the course of its original run.

Plot 
Lurdes (Regina Casé), Vitória (Taís Araújo) and Thelma (Adriana Esteves) are three women from different social classes that live their dilemmas as mothers. Lurdes is a struggling woman who had four children: Magno, Ryan, Érica, and Domênico, who was sold at the age of 2 by her ex-husband to child trafficker Kátia (Vera Holtz). Knowing that Domênico was sent to Rio de Janeiro, Lurdes decides to go look for him with the rest of her children and, on the way, she finds the orphan Camila (Jessica Ellen), whom she decides to raise. Vitória is a 45-year-old lawyer who has been unable to get pregnant, so she decides to adopt a child. While waiting for her adopted son to arrive, she meets Davi (Vladimir Brichta). Vitória spends the night with him and is surprised to discover that she is pregnant. Thelma has been a widow for more than 20 years and is overprotective of her son Danilo (Chay Suede). When Danilo was a child he survived a fire that killed his father, thanks to his mother who saved him. Thelma's life changes when she discovers that she has an incurable brain aneurysm. She decides to make a list of things she wants to do before passing away, but all the wishes on her list involve Danilo, who does not know about the disease and wants to have distance from his mother because he feels suffocated. Throughout the story, the three women will discover a bond that will connect their lives forever.

Series overview

Cast 
 Regina Casé as Lurdes dos Santos Silva
 Adriana Esteves as Thelma Nunes Viana
 Taís Araújo as Vitória Amorim
 Isis Valverde as Betina Torres da Nóbrega
 Humberto Carrão as Sandro Amorim Camargo
 Chay Suede as Danilo Lopes Viana
 Irandhir Santos as Álvaro da Nóbrega
 Juliano Cazarré a Magno dos Santos Silva
 Arieta Corrêa as Leila Moreira dos Santos
 Vladimir Brichta as Davi Moretti
 Murilo Benício as Raul Camargo
 Nanda Costa as Érica dos Santos Silva
 Jéssica Ellen as Camila dos Santos
 Thiago Martins as Ryan dos Santos Silva
 Érika Januza as Marina Castro
 Malu Galli as Maria Lídia Camargo
 Letícia Lima as Estela Teixeira
 Tuca Andrada as Belizário Lacerda
 Camila Márdila as Amanda Crespo
 Maria as Verena Ovisco 
 Magali Biff as Nicete Torres
 Enrique Diaz as Durval Barbosa
 Nanego Lira as José de Oliveira
 Débora Lamm as Miranda Amorim Junqueira
 Milhem Cortaz as Dr. Matias Junqueira
 Isabel Teixeira as Jane D'Ávila
 Clarissa Kiste as Natália Amorim 
 Ana Flavia Cavalcanti as Miriam Amaral  
 Clarissa Pinheiro as Maria da Penha Moreira "Penha"
 Douglas Silva as Marconi
 Alejandro Claveaux as Tales Paiva
 Giulio Lopes as Miguel Moretti 
 Duda Batsow as Carolina "Carol" Amorim Barbosa
 WJ as Edvaldo Lopes "Garnizé"
 Dora Freind as Loyane Barreto
 Dida Camero as Eunice Matos Brandão 
 Rodolfo Vaz as Nuno
 Nando Brandão as Lucas Gonçalves 
 Susanna Kruger as Osana Barreto
 Gustavo Novaes as Treinador Samuel
 MC Cabelinho as Diogo Barreto "Farula"/"MC Farula" 
 Aldene Abreu as Dayse das Chagas
 Xamã as Phanton
 Alex Patrício as Iuri Porto
 Tobias Carrieres as Nivaldo Machado 
 Cacá Ottoni as Joana de Sá
 Beatrice Sayd as Edilene Reis
 Clara Galinari as Brenda Moreira dos Santos
 Pedro Guilherme Rodrigues as Tiago Amorim
 Gabriel Palhares as Nicolas Amorim Junqueira
 Gianlucca Mauad as Tomás Amorim Junqueira

Guest cast 

 Vera Holtz as Kátia Matos Brandão
 Lucy Alves as Young Lurdes dos Santos Silva
 Daniel Ribeiro as Jandir Silva
 Luiz Carlos Vasconcelos as Januário Silva
 Júlio Andrade as Sinésio Viana
 Guilherme Hamacek as Benjamim Ferraz Moretti
 Rodrigo García as Vicente Novaes
 Fabrício Boliveira as Paulo
 Filipe Duarte as Gabriel "Gabo" Garcez
 Mariana Nunes as Rita Pereira Moura
 Antônio Benício as Vinícius Camargo
 Paulo Gabriel as Genilson Torres
 Dan Ferreira as Wesley Madureira
 Andrea Dantas as Fátima Bernardino
 Luísa Sonza as Mel
 Anitta as Sabrina
 Mouhamed Harfouch as Daniel Vilanova Hidalgo
 Léo Rosa as César
 Letícia Pedro as Ive Gonzales
 Cláudio Gabriel as Detetive Clóvis Benemério
 Roberta Gualda as Silvânia
 Marcelo Escorel as Dr. Quintela
 Gabriel Kaufmann as Fabiano
 Letícia Isnard as Tracy
 Fábio Lago as Carlinhos Novaes
 Joelson Medeiros as Silas
 Roberto Frota as Seu Onofre
 Cinira Camargo as Tânia Matos Brandão
 Zezita de Matos as Maria dos Santos
 Lana Guelero as Celeste
 Ângela Rabelo as Mariluz Novaes
 Dhonata Augusto as Vapor
 Paulo Verlings as Fantón
 Guilherme Duarte as Mário Sérgio
 Kacau Gomes as Lucimara
 Charles Fricks as Dr. Ronaldo
 Thelmo Fernandes as Capitão Bruno
 Inez Viana as Sílvia
 Ravel Andrade as Elias
 Arnaldo Marques as Dr. Gilberto
 Raquel Fabbri as Lucélia
 Saulo Segreto as Capitão Jorge 
 Wilson Rabelo as Eudésio 
 Maureen Miranda as Sheila
 Zemanuel Piñero as Agenor Crespo
 Mariah da Penha as Dona Clemildes
 Marcos Dioli as Nelson
 Démick Lopes as Guará
 Isis Pessino as Cássia
 Séfora Rangel as Alaíde
 Susanna Kruger as Osana
 Jack Berraquero as Jader
 Alexandre David as Dalto
 Ruan Aguiar as Adriel
 Jeniffer Dias as Salete
 Gabriel Reif as Jhonatan
 Márcio Machado as Dr. Xavier
 Tiago Homci as Bombeiro
 Aisha Moura as Aluna de Camila
 Fabiana Schunk as Dançarina de tango
 Gabriella Vergani as Young Thelma
 Izabela Prado as Young Vitória
 Stella Rabello as Young Kátia
 Daniel Carvalho as Young Sinésio
 Catarina de Carvalho as Young Miranda
 Fernanda Lasevitch as Young Jane
 Priscilla Vilela as Young Celeste
 Eros Lázari as Child Domênico
 João Guilherme Fonseca as Child Magno
 Pietro Buannafina as Child Ryan
 Luciano Huck as Himself  
 Cissa Guimarães as Herself
 Zeca Camargo as Himself
 Lázaro Ramos as narrator
 Eliane Giardini as Vera
 Olívia Araújo as Zenaide

Production 
Manuela Dias delivered the synopsis of the plot in the first semester of 2017, and on 19 June of that year the project was approved to enter the queue of 9pm telenovelas for 2019. Originally the plot would be called Troia, in reference to the mythological city, but the name was changed to Amor de Mãe (Mother's Love) to better express the central plot around the three mothers. Filming of the telenovela began in August 2019. Amor de Mãe was the first production to be filmed in Globo's newly opened MG4 studios. On 16 March 2020, it was announced that filming of the telenovela was suspended indefinitely due to the COVID-19 pandemic; the final episode of the first part would air on 21 March 2020. Reruns of previous telenovelas currently occupy its timeslot. Filming resumed on 10 August 2020, with work pace being reduced to comply with safety guidelines. 23 episodes are planned to be filmed and will premiere in 2021. Part of the changes in production include actors arriving to the recording studios with their makeup and costumes ready. Those who need to travel for the studios are now staying in a hotel. Because of these changes, some actors were eliminated from the production, such as Alejandro Claveaux who portrayed Tales.

Soundtrack

Volume 1 

Amor de Mãe Vol. 1 is the first soundtrack of the telenovela, released on 7 February 2020 by Som Livre.

Volume 2 

Amor de Mãe Vol. 2 is the second soundtrack of the telenovela, released on 28 February 2020 by Som Livre.

Reception

Ratings

Awards and nominations

References

External links 
 
 Website

2019 telenovelas
TV Globo telenovelas
Brazilian telenovelas
2019 Brazilian television series debuts
2021 Brazilian television series endings
2010s Brazilian television series
Brazilian LGBT-related television shows
Lesbian-related television shows
Portuguese-language telenovelas
Television productions suspended due to the COVID-19 pandemic
Child abduction in television
Human trafficking in fiction